Universal Saratov is a bandy club in Saratov, Russia. The club was founded in 1953 and is playing in the Russian Bandy Supreme League, the second tier of Russian bandy. The home games are played at Stadium Dynamo. The building of an indoor arena is being considered. The club colours are black and white.

Team picture:

External links
Official homepage

References

Bandy clubs in Russia
Bandy clubs in the Soviet Union
Sport in Saratov
Bandy clubs established in 1953
1953 establishments in Russia